Hiroshi Suzuki (November 12, 1933 – January 16, 2020) was a Japanese American jazz trombonist.

Career 
Suzuki moved to the United States at 38 to play with bandleader and drummer Buddy Rich. Suzuki lived in Las Vegas. In 1975, he returned to Japan and recorded the five tracks on his album Cat, released on February 26, 1976. After release the album didn't receive any notable acclaim. However, 39 years later in 2015, Columbia Records re-released the album in Japan to bring it to a wider audience. In the 21st century, the album has received some critical acclaim.

Personal life 
Suzuki died on January 16, 2020, in Las Vegas at the age of 86.

Discography

Studio albums
Cat (1976)

References

1933 births
2020 deaths
American jazz trombonists
Japanese-American instrumentalists
Japanese emigrants to the United States
Japanese jazz trombonists
Musicians from Yokohama